The Soup is a 2017 South Korean family drama film starring Shin Jung-geun, Yoon Park, Jang So-yeon and Go Na-hee. Written and directed by Lim Young-hoon, it was based on the true story of an ex-convict who entered the home of a mentally disabled couple with a 7-year-old daughter, and ends up living with them. It premiered and was named Best Foreign Feature at the 26th Arizona International Film Festival 2017.

Plot
Abandoned by his family due to his wrongdoings, ex-convict Jae-goo (Yoon Park) makes a living working as a construction worker. One day, he meets and approaches mentally disabled Soon-sik (Shin Jung-geun) at a funeral hall who let him spends the night at his house. The next morning Jae-goo leaves, but when Soon-sik comes home from work, he is startled to find Jae-goo at his home again.

Cast
 Shin Jung-geun as Soon-sik
 Yoon Park as Jae-goo
 Jang So-yeon as Ae-shim
 Go Na-hee as Soon-young
 Kim Hyun as Landlady
 Gi Ju-bong as president
 Shin Cheol-jin as Barber	
 Jung Kyu-soo as Head Seo

References

External links
 
 
 

2017 films
South Korean drama films
2010s Korean-language films
2010s South Korean films